Guzmania sibundoyorum is a plant species in the genus Guzmania. This species is native to Ecuador and Colombia.

References

sibundoyorum
Flora of Colombia
Flora of Ecuador
Plants described in 1953